The middle suprarenal artery (middle capsular artery) is a paired artery in the abdomen. It is a branch of the aorta. It supplies the adrenal gland.

Structure

Origin 
The middle suprarenal artery (usually) arises from lateral aspect of the abdominal aorta. Its origin occurs at roughly the same level as that of the superior mesenteric artery.

Course 
The vessel passes laterally and slightly superior-ward, passing over the crura of the diaphragm to reach the surface of the ipsilateral suprarenal gland, whereupon it forms anastomoses with the other suprarenal arteries.

Relations 
The anatomical relations of the left and right middle superior artery differ. The right vessel crosses the inferior vena cava posteriorly near the right celiac ganglion. The left vessel passes near the right celiac ganglion, superior margin of the spleen, and splenic artery.

Variation 
There is usually a single middle suprarenal artery (on either side of the body), but in some individuals, there may be multiple, or the vessel may be absent.

The vessel may sometimes arise from the (ipsilateral) renal artery, or (ipsilateral) inferior phrenic artery.

Function 
The middle suprarenal artery supplies the adrenal gland.

Clinical significance 
The middle suprarenal artery may be assessed using Doppler ultrasound.

History 
The middle suprarenal artery may also be known as the middle adrenal artery or the middle capsular artery.

See also 

 Superior suprarenal artery
 Inferior suprarenal artery

References

External links 
  - "Posterior Abdominal Wall: Branches of the Abdominal Aorta"

Arteries of the abdomen
Adrenal gland